9:06 is a 2009 Slovene thriller film directed by Igor Šterk. The film was selected as the Slovene entry for the Best Foreign Language Film at the 83rd Academy Awards but it did not make the final shortlist. The film won 15 awards at the 2009 Slovene Film Festival, including Best Film and Best Director.

Cast
 Silva Cusin - Ex Wife
 Labina Mitevska - Milena
 Pavle Ravnohrib - Tine
 Igor Samobor - Dusan

See also
 List of submissions to the 83rd Academy Awards for Best Foreign Language Film
 List of Slovenian submissions for the Academy Award for Best Foreign Language Film

References

External links

2009 films
Slovene-language films
2009 thriller films
Slovenian thriller films